L. Jean Willoughby (née Kauffman; July 7, 1925April 18, 2015) was an American politician.

Early life and education
L. Jean Kauffman was born on July 7, 1925 in Peoria, Illinois to parents Louis and Agnes Kauffman. Jean attended Academy of Our Lady. She became a registered nurse at St. Francis Hospital, after which she met her husband, William A. Willoughby. Jean and William married in 1949. Together they had six children. After having children, Jean went to college. From the University of Detroit, she earned a BA in communications and an MA in political science.

Career
In 1980, Willoughby, residing in Bloomfield Hills, sought political office for the first time. She ran as a Republican against the incumbent Democratic State Representative Charlie James Harrison Jr. of Pontiac, who had already served four-terms, in the 62nd district. David Kushma of the Detroit Free Press described Willoughby's victory on November 4 as the "biggest upset" of the 1980 state house elections. Willoughby won by a slim margin of 346 votes. This was confirmed after a recount.

As state representative, Willoughby continued the support of her Democratic predecessors for state subsidies for the Pontiac Silverdome. The stadium was within the boundaries of her district. In 1981, she argued it was important for the state to continue its funding of the Silverdome as the 1982 Super Bowl was being hosted there, which would bring the state a profit.

In 1982, the state house districts were re-drawn and Willoughby was in the new 65th district. Willoughby attempted re-election against incumbent Republican State Rep. Ruth McNamee of Birmingham in the primary election. Willoughby was ultimately defeated by McNamee.

From 1983 to 1991, Willoughby worked as budget director for Oakland County.

Personal life
Willoughby was Roman Catholic.

Later life and death
Willoughby retired to Horseshoe Bay, Texas. There, she volunteered as a guardian ad litem for Court Appointed Special Advocates. She later moved to Tucson, Arizona. Willboughby died in her home in Oro Valley, Arizona on April 18, 2015.

References

1925 births
2015 deaths
Catholics from Illinois
Catholics from Michigan
Catholics from Arizona
Republican Party members of the Michigan House of Representatives
Politicians from Peoria, Illinois
People from Bloomfield Hills, Michigan
People from Tucson, Arizona
University of Detroit Mercy alumni
Women state legislators in Michigan
American nurses
American women nurses
20th-century American women politicians
20th-century American politicians